Thorybes pylades, the northern cloudywing, is a butterfly species of the family Hesperiidae.

Description
The wingspan of T. pylades is between 32 and 47 mm. Both males and females have completely dark brown wings except for the small triangular clear spots.

Distribution
The northern cloudywing is seen from Nova Scotia west across Canada, south into California and across the rest of the United States. Its habitat consist of open boreal woodlands, forest edges, and open fields.

Life cycle
Adults lay eggs singly under the leaves of their host plants. The caterpillars then will eat till they are ready to pupate at which point they will roll themselves into the host plants' leaves. They fly between May and July where there is only one brood, but in the south they fly from March and September where there are two broods.

Larval food
Fabaceae
Desmodium
Lespedeza
Trifolium
Hosackia

Nectaring flowers
Apocynum
Prunella
Securigera varia
Lonicera japonica
Thistle
Asclepias syriaca
Dianthus armeria
Verbena

References

Butterflies of North America
Butterflies described in 1870
Taxa named by Samuel Hubbard Scudder
pylades